In Catalan mythology, a Puigmal is considered the protector of trees and animals, who defends against attacks on humans. He is said to inhabit the mountains overlooking the valley of Ribes (Ripollés).

Catalan legendary creatures